Cylindera arenaria is a species of ground beetle of the subfamily Cicindelinae that can be found everywhere in Europe except for Estonia, Portugal, Northwestern Europe, and various European islands.

References

arenaria
Beetles described in 1775
Taxa named by Johann Kaspar Füssli
Beetles of Europe